Kilab ibn Murrah (born  CE) was an ancestor of the Islamic prophet Muhammad. Specifically, he was his great-great-great-great-grandfather.

Biography
Kilab was the son of Murrah ibn Ka'b ibn Lu'ayy ibn Ghalib ibn Fihr ibn Malik by his first wife Hind bint Surayr ibn Tha'labah ibn Harith ibn Fihr ibn Malik. Both his parents traced their lineage back to Fihr, the progenitor of the Quraysh, and further to Ismail (Ishmael), son of Ibrahim (Abraham).

He had two half-brothers, Taym ibn Murrah and Yaqazah ibn Murrah, through his father's second wife, Asma bint Adiy (Hind bint Harithah al-Bariqiyyah) of Asad.

He was married to Fatimah bint Sa'd ibn Sayl, who bore him two sons. His elder son, Zuhrah ibn Kilab, was the progenitor of the Banu Zuhrah clan, and his younger son, Qusai ibn Kilab, became the first Quraysh custodian of the Ka'aba. After his death, his wife married Rabi'ah ibn Haram from the Banu Udhrah tribe.

Family tree

 * indicates that the marriage order is disputed
 Note that direct lineage is marked in bold.

See also
Family tree of Muhammad

References

373 births
Year of death unknown
4th-century Arabs
Ancestors of Muhammad
Sahabah ancestors
Quraysh